

Managers
+ Caretaker manager
(n/a) = Information not available
Matches either won or lost during penalties shootouts are listed as draws.

Information correct as of match played December 02, 2017. Only competitive matches are counted.

Notes and references

Otelul Galati
Otelul Galati